Dylan Windler (born September 22, 1996) is an American professional basketball player for the Cleveland Cavaliers of the National Basketball Association (NBA). He played college basketball for the Belmont Bruins.

High school career
Dylan grew up in Indianapolis, Indiana, where he attended Perry Meridian High School. In addition to basketball, Windler excelled at golf and participated in various junior golf tournaments. In the summer of 2014, Windler was selected to play for the Indiana Elite AAU team alongside future Virginia player Kyle Guy. His performance attracted scholarship offers from 15 Division I schools, and he eventually signed with Belmont. Windler led the state in points and rebounds per game as a senior with 27.3 points and 10.2 rebounds per contest.

College career
As a freshman, Windler played a reserve role, averaging around 4.3 points per game. His following sophomore year, he took on a starting guard position and became an outside threat with a 39.8% three-point completion rate, averaging 9.2 points per game. Windler's junior year was a breakout season with 17.3 points per game, 9.3 rebounds per game, and shooting over 45 % from three. He had a career-high 36-point, 20-rebound game against Morehead State on February 17, 2018. He was named to the First-Team All-OVC. Coming into his senior season, Windler was named to the 2019 Julius Erving Award Watch List. Windler broke his career-high in points with 41, including a career-high eight 3-pointers, along with 10 rebounds and three steals in a 96-86 win against Morehead State on February 10, 2019. As a senior, he scored 21.3 points per game and collected 10.8 rebounds per game, helping Belmont qualify for the NCAA tournament as an at-large. In a win over Temple, Windler had five points, 14 rebounds, and two assists and three steals. The Belmont Bruins faced off against the Maryland Terrapins in the NCAA Tournament Round of 64. Despite 35 points and 11 rebounds from Windler, Belmont narrowly lost 79–77.

Professional career

Cleveland Cavaliers (2019–present)
Windler was drafted 26th overall by the Cleveland Cavaliers in the 2019 NBA draft. On July 3, 2019, he signed his rookie scale contract with the Cavaliers. In January 2020, Windler was ruled out for the season with a leg injury. He had not played yet for the Cavaliers.

Windler made his NBA debut on December 23, 2020, recording three points and two steals in a 121–114 win over the Charlotte Hornets. On February 23, 2021, he scored a career-high 15 points, alongside five rebounds, in a 112–111 win over the Atlanta Hawks.

Career statistics

NBA

|-
| style="text-align:left;"| 2020–21
| style="text-align:left;"| Cleveland
| 31 || 0 || 16.5 || .438 || .338 || .778 || 3.5 || 1.1 || .6 || .4 || 5.2
|-
| style="text-align:left;"| 2021–22
| style="text-align:left;"| Cleveland
| 50 || 0 || 9.2 || .378 || .300 || .833 || 1.8 || .7 || .3 || .1 || 2.2
|- class="sortbottom"
| style="text-align:center;" colspan="2"| Career
| 81 || 0 || 12.0 || .412 || .320 || .800 || 2.4 || .8 || .4 || .2 || 3.3

College

|-
| style="text-align:left;"| 2015–16
| style="text-align:left;"| Belmont
|| 32 || 1 || 18.4 || .495 || .239 || .667 || 4.5 || .9 || .6 || .6 || 4.3
|-
| style="text-align:left;"| 2016–17 
| style="text-align:left;"| Belmont
|| 30 || 30 || 30.1 || .533 || .398 || .733 || 6.3 || 1.6 || .9 || 1.0 || 9.2
|-
| style="text-align:left;"| 2017–18 
| style="text-align:left;"| Belmont 
|| 33 || 33 || 35.4 || .559 || .426 || .718 || 9.3 || 2.7 || 1.0 || .9 || 17.3
|-
| style="text-align:left;"| 2018–19
| style="text-align:left;"| Belmont
|| 33 || 33 || 33.2 || .540 || .429 || .847 || 10.8 || 2.5 || 1.4 || .6 || 21.3
|- class="sortbottom"
| style="text-align:center;" colspan="2"| Career
|| 128 || 97 || 29.4 || .541 || .406 || .761 || 7.8 || 2.0 || 1.0 || .8 || 13.2

References

External links

Belmont Bruins bio 

1996 births
Living people
American men's basketball players
Basketball players from Indianapolis
Belmont Bruins men's basketball players
Canton Charge players
Cleveland Cavaliers draft picks
Cleveland Cavaliers players
Cleveland Charge players
Shooting guards
Small forwards